Kenny Nolan is the eponymous debut album from singer-songwriter Kenny Nolan. It featured two U.S. top 20 hits, "I Like Dreamin'" and "Love's Grown Deep". Both songs did equally well or better in Canada. Another track, "My Eyes Get Blurry", reached No. 97 in the U.S.

The song, "Wakin' Up to Love", was recorded by Frankie Valli on his 1975 Closeup album, and also covered by Jimmy Dean in 1976 for his album, I.O.U.

Track listing
 A1 "I Like Dreamin'" – 3:27 (Kenny Nolan)
 A2 "My Jolé"  – 2:49 (Kenny Nolan)
 A3 "If You Ever Stopped Callin' Me Baby"  – 4:08 (Kenny Nolan)
 A4 "Time Ain't Time Enough" – 2:59 (Kenny Nolan)
 A5 "My Eyes Get Blurry" – 3:57 (Kenny Nolan)
 B1 "Love's Grown Deep" – 3:54 (Kenny Nolan)
 B2 "Wakin' Up to Love" – 3:15 (Bob Crewe, Kenny Nolan)
 B3 "Monette" – 2:50 (Kenny Nolan)
 B4 "Today I Met the Girl I'm Gonna Marry" – 3:07 (Kenny Nolan)
 B5 "My World Will Wait for You" – 5:25 (Kenny Nolan)

Personnel

Music
 Kenny Nolan – lead vocals
 Artwork by Alice Hall, Clyde Terry

Charts

References

1977 debut albums
20th Century Fox Records albums